Association of Indian Universities (AIU) is an organisation and association of major universities in India. It is based in Delhi. It evaluates the courses, syllabi, standards, and credits of foreign Universities pursued abroad and equates them in relation to various courses offered by Indian Universities.

The AIU is mainly concerned with the recognition of Degrees/Diplomas awarded by the Universities in India, which are recognized by the UGC, New Delhi, and abroad for the purpose of admission to higher degree courses in Indian Universities. The AIU is also an implementing agency for the agreements signed under the Cultural Exchange Programmes executed between India and other countries in the field of education, insofar as it relates to the recognition of foreign qualifications (except for medicine and allied courses). 

It is a member of Board of Control for Cricket in India.

Cricket
The Association of Indian Universities is a member of Board of Control for Cricket in India. The AIU is a Full Member of the BCCI, and on the same pedestal as other state and regional cricket associations. Being a Full Member, AIU also possesses voting rights in BCCI elections.

Competitions

Rohinton Baria Trophy

The Rohinton Baria Trophy is the premier inter-university cricket tournament in India. It has been contested since 1935–36.

Vizzy Trophy
The Vizzy Trophy is an annual inter-zonal university limited overs cricket tournament conducted by the AIU and named after former Indian cricketer and BCCI president, the Maharajkumar of Vizianagram. It is a List A tournament. The competition began in 1966–67 and was traditionally held during February. The BCCI and the AIU jointly organised it annually until 2011, when the BCCI ceased funding it. It has not been held since 2010–11. In February 2014, it was held in Mysore.  In 2019 BCCI alloted Cricket Association of Uttarakhand hosting rights for 2020 Vizzy trophy. 2023-24 Vizzy trophy scheduled to play in Raipur from 10 March 2023 to 12 March 2023, in RDCA Ground and Shaheed Veer Narayan Singh International Cricket Stadium in Raipur, Chhattisgarh.

See also
National Assessment and Accreditation Council
National Institute of Open Schooling
Department of Higher Education
Medical Council of India
Council of Architecture

References

College and university associations and consortia in Asia
Educational organisations based in India
Consortia in India
1925 establishments in India
Organizations established in 1925
Organisations based in Delhi